The Association for the Study of Literature and Environment (ASLE), also known as ASLE-USA, is the principal professional association for American and international scholars of ecocriticism and environmental humanities. It was founded in 1992 at a special session of the Western Literature Association conference in Reno, Nevada for the purpose of "sharing of facts, ideas, and texts concerning the study of literature and the environment."

The association hosts a biennial conference since 1995, alternating with symposia in non-conference years. 

ASLE's journal is Interdisciplinary Studies in Literature and Environment (ISLE), a quarterly published by Oxford University Press, in which the most current scholarship in the rapidly evolving field of environmental humanities can often be found.

ASLE Presidents, Conferences and Symposia 
This is a list of people who have served as presidents of ASLE since its inception in 1992. The biennial conferences/symposia held during their tenure are given along.

See also

 Ecocriticism

References

External links
 Association for the Study of Literature and Environment
 Interdisciplinary Studies in Literature and Environment

Learned societies of the United States
Ecology organizations